Jitex BK, more commonly known as just Jitex, is a football club in Mölndal, Sweden, that competes in Elitettan, the second tier of Swedish women's football. The club was founded January 21, 1971 and previously played in the Elitettan, Sweden's second highest division, and the top division league, the Damallsvenskan.

Jitex won six national championships and three victories in the Swedish Cup during the 1970s and 1980s. The Jitex name came from the first sponsor; Jitex fashion house. The team which has become known for their characteristic purple kit, was first trained by Sven Lundbeck. Notable players during this successful era include Anette Börjesson, Elisabeth Leidinge, Anna Svenjeby and Pia Sundhage.

Financial problems in the early 1990s saw a 1993 merger with local rivals GAIS (Göteborgs Atlet-och Idrottssällskap or Gothenburg Athletics and Sports Association in English) and the adoption of the name Jitex BK/JG93. The team stumbled out of the Damallsvenskan in 1997. After reverting to the original name and transforming the team, the club has since climbed back up the leagues. Following victory in the 2005 Söderettan, the team played in the Damallsvenskan for 2006, but were relegated again the same year. In 2009 Jitex returned to the Damallsvenskan ahead of the 2010 campaign. Jitex were relegated from the Damallsvenskan in 2014, with few games remaining.

2022 squad

.

Former players
For notable current and former players, see :Category:Jitex BK players.

References

External links 

Webpage

 
Women's football clubs in Sweden
Football clubs in Gothenburg
1971 establishments in Sweden
Damallsvenskan teams
Association football clubs established in 1971
Football clubs in Västra Götaland County